Beaufortia polylepis is a species of river loach (family Balitoridae or Gastromyzontidae, depending on the source). It is endemic to the Nanpan River in Yunnan, China. It inhabits rocky streams and measures  standard length.

References 

Beaufortia (fish)
Freshwater fish of China
Endemic fauna of Yunnan
Fish described in 1982